Atrial tachycardia is a type of heart rhythm problem in which the heart's electrical impulse comes from an ectopic pacemaker (that is, an abnormally located cardiac pacemaker) in the upper chambers (atria) of the heart, rather than from the sinoatrial node, the normal origin of the heart's electrical activity.
As with any other form of tachycardia (rapid heart beat), the underlying mechanism can be either the rapid discharge of an abnormal focus, the presence of a ring of cardiac tissue that gives rise to a circle movement (reentry), or a triggered rapid rhythm due to other pathological circumstances (as would be the case with some drug toxicities, such as digoxin toxicity).

Classification
Forms of atrial tachycardia (ATach) include multifocal atrial tachycardia (MAT), focal atrial tachycardia and atrial flutter. Paroxysmal atrial tachycardia (PAT) is an episode of arrhythmia that begins and ends abruptly.

Etiology

Atrial tachycardia tends to occur in individuals with structural heart disease, with or without heart failure, and ischemic coronary artery disease. However, focal atrial tachycardia often occurs in healthy individuals without structural heart disease. Other possible etiologies are listed below:
 Hypoxia
 Pulmonary disease
 Ischemic heart disease
 Stimulants: cocaine, caffeine, chocolate, ephedra
 Alcohol
 Metabolic disturbances
 Digoxin toxicity
 Heightened sympathetic tone
A study noted 10 to 15% of patients presenting for supraventricular tachycardia (SVT) ablation had atrial tachycardia.

Diagnosis

Electrocardiographic features include:
 Atrial rate: 100 to 250 BPM
 Ventricular conduction can be variable
 Irregular or irregularly irregular in the setting of variable AV block
 Regular if 1 to 1, 2 to 1, or 4 to 1 AV block
 P wave morphology
 Unifocal, but similar in morphology to each other
 Might be inverted
 Differs from normal sinus P wave
 May exhibit either long RP or short PR intervals
 Rhythm may be paroxysmal or sustained
 May demonstrate an increase in the rate at initiation (e.g., "warm up," or "rev up")
 May demonstrate a decrease in the rate at termination (e.g., "cool down")

Treatment

Initial management of focal atrial tachycardia should focus on addressing underlying causes: treating acute illness, cessation of stimulants, stress reduction, appropriately managing digoxin toxicity, or chronic disease management. The ventricular rate is controllable with the use of beta blockers or calcium channel blockers. If atrial tachyarrhythmia persists and the patient is symptomatic, the patient may benefit from class IA, IC, or class III antiarrhythmics. Catheter ablation of focal atrial tachycardia may be appropriate in patients failing medical therapy.

Epidemiology

A European study of young males applying for pilot licenses demonstrated that 0.34% had asymptomatic atrial tachycardia and 0.46% had symptomatic atrial tachycardia.

References

External links 

Cardiac arrhythmia